Amy Huberman (born 20 March 1979) is an Irish actress and writer. She is known for her role as Daisy in the RTÉ drama series The Clinic. In 2018, she began writing and starring in the comedy series Finding Joy.

Early life
Huberman grew up in Dublin, south Dublin. She is the middle child of three siblings and the only daughter. Her father Harold was born in London to a Polish Jewish family; her mother Sandra is from County Wexford. Her parents married in 1974. Her brother, Mark Huberman, is also an actor and worked in films such as Boy Eats Girl and on The Clinic as Kieran Miller.

She was educated at Loreto College, Foxrock and she took classes in the Betty Ann Norton Drama School. Following school, she attended University College Dublin (UCD) intending to become a social worker, but when she found the drama society her career took a different direction.

Acting career
From 2003 to 2009, Huberman portrayed the role of Daisy on RTÉ's drama series The Clinic. Her film appearances include Satellites & Meteorites, and A Film with Me in It, both released in 2008.

Writing
Huberman's debut novel, Hello Heartbreak, was published on 2 July 2009. In 2018, Huberman began writing and starring in the comedy series Finding Joy, as titular character Joy. To date, two series have been broadcast on RTÉ.

Personal life
Huberman married former Ireland rugby captain Brian O'Driscoll in July 2010 in Lough Rynn Castle; the couple have three children.

Filmography

References

External links
 

1979 births
Living people
People educated at Loreto College, Foxrock
Irish film actresses
Irish people of Polish-Jewish descent
Irish television actresses
Alumni of University College Dublin
21st-century Irish actresses
21st-century Irish novelists
Irish women novelists
Irish screenwriters
Irish women screenwriters
Actresses from County Dublin
21st-century Irish women writers
Irish people of Jewish descent
21st-century Irish screenwriters
Rugby union players' wives and girlfriends